Geri Winkler (born 13 April 1956 in Vienna, Austria) is an Austrian mountaineer, who was the first insulin-dependent diabetic to reach the summit of Mount Everest.

Since 1984, Winkler has taught mathematics, French, and German language in Vienna. In September 1984, he was diagnosed with diabetes mellitus type 1. In April 1987, he ran the Vienna marathon, marking the first time a diabetic patient had finished a marathon.

In the 1990s he ascended Popocatepetl in Mexico and Muztagh Ata (7546 m) in China. In the summer of 2001, he climbed Elbrus in Russia, the highest mountain in Europe. In the winter of 2002 and 2003, Winkler climbed Aconcagua in Argentina, the tallest mountain in South America.

In late 2005, Winkler started a six-month tour of seven countries that started at the Dead Sea by bicycle and ended at Mount Everest. On 20 May 2006, Winkler became the first insulin-dependent diabetic to reach the top of Mount Everest.

Summits
Two examples
On May 20, 2006, Geri Winkler is recorded to have summited Mount Everest
On September 30, 2009 Geri Winkler is recorded to have summited Cho Oyu

Publications 
 Winkler G. (Ed.) Aufbruch in die Grenzenlosigkeit. Die Freiheit eines Diabetikerlebens. (German lang.). 2000. .
 Winkler G. Sieben Welten - Seven Summits. Mein Weg zu den höchsten Gipfeln aller Kontinente. (German lang.). Tyrolia-Verlag, Innsbruck and Wien 2011. .

References 

 Connie Levett, TheAge 2006 (Newspaper / Australia): The deadly business of climbing Everest

External links 
Report of the Climb of Mount Everest (German)

See also
List of Mount Everest records
Will Cross

1956 births
Austrian mountain climbers
Austrian summiters of Mount Everest
Austrian male writers
Living people